Lake Township, Illinois may refer to:
Lake Township, Clinton County, Illinois
Lake Township, Cook County, Illinois, also known as the Town of Lake, annexed to Chicago in 1889